Cyprus participated in the Eurovision Song Contest 2021 in Rotterdam, the Netherlands. The Cypriot broadcaster Cyprus Broadcasting Corporation (CyBC) internally selected Elena Tsagrinou as its representative with the song "". "" was written and composed by Thomas Stengaard, Laurell Barker, Oxa, and Jimmy Thörnfeldt. Cyprus performed 8th in the first semi-final of the Eurovision Song Contest 2021, held on 18 May 2021, and placed 6th, receiving 170 points. The entry qualified for the final held four days later, where the nation placed 16th with 94 points.

Background

Prior to the 2021 contest, Cyprus had participated in the Eurovision Song Contest thirty-six times since the island country made its debut in the 1981 contest. Its best placing was at the  where Eleni Foureira placed second with "". Before that, Cyprus's best result was fifth, which it achieved three times: in the 1982 competition with the song "" performed by Anna Vissi, in the 1997 edition with "" performed by Hara and Andreas Constantinou, and the 2004 contest with "Stronger Every Minute" performed by Lisa Andreas. Cyprus' least successful result was in the 1986 contest when it placed last with the song "" by Elpida, receiving only four points in total. However, its worst finish in terms of points received was when it placed second to last in the 1999 contest with "" by Marlain Angelidou, receiving only two points. After returning to the contest in 2015 following their one-year absence from the 2014 edition due to the 2012–13 Cypriot financial crisis and the broadcaster's budget restrictions, Cyprus has qualified for the final of all the contests in which it has participated.

The Cypriot national broadcaster, CyBC, broadcasts the contest within Cyprus and organises the selection process for the nation's entry. Cyprus has used various methods to select its entry in the past, such as internal selections and televised national finals to choose the performer, song or both to compete at Eurovision. In 2015, the broadcaster organised the national final Eurovision Song Project, which featured 54 songs competing in a nine-week-long process resulting in the selection of the Cypriot entry through the combination of public televoting and the votes from an expert jury. Since 2016, however, the broadcaster has opted to select the entry internally without input from the public.

Before Eurovision

Internal selection
On 25 November 2020, CyBC announced that they had internally selected Greek singer Elena Tsagrinou to represent Cyprus in Rotterdam with the song "". Tsagrinou previously participated in the second season of  where she progressed to the semi-final. Signed to Panik Records, she was a former member of the group Otherview. "" was written by Jimmy "Joker" Thörnfeldt, Laurell Barker, Oxa, and Thomas Stengaard. Barker and Stengaard have written several Eurovision entries for various countries with the latter having written the Danish Eurovision Song Contest 2013 winning song "Only Teardrops". On 25 January 2021, Tsagrinou announced on her Instagram account that the song would be released exactly one month later, on 24 February 2021.

A preview of "" was presented to the public on 24 February 2021 during the RIK 1 programme Happy Hour, hosted by Andreas Giortsios. The official preview video for the song, directed by George Benioudakis was also available on the Panik Records mobile app and website. The music video was hosted on the website until 27 February; on 28 February, the song and full length music video was officially released to the public.

Reception 
Upon release, the song was controversial within Cyprus, with the Church of Cyprus calling for the withdrawal of song. The church stated that the song made an international mockery of country's moral foundations by advocating "our surrender to the devil and promoting his worship". They felt that the song was offensive, disrespectful and unrepresentative, and demanded that the state broadcaster CyBC withdraw Cyprus' Eurovision entry. In February 2021, Orthodox Christians in Cyprus launched an online petition to ask the withdrawal from the Eurovision Song Contest. This was followed by a protest held in March outside of CyBC to demand the song's withdrawal, and a petition signed by just over 20,000 people on Avaaz to urge for the cancellation of the country's Eurovision participation. The government publicly rejected the reactions from religious and conservative groups, claiming it respects both spiritual rights but also the freedom of artistic expression.

At Eurovision 

The Eurovision Song Contest 2021 took place at Rotterdam Ahoy in Rotterdam, the Netherlands, and consisted of two semi-finals held on the respective dates of 18 and 20 May, and the final on 22 May 2021. According to Eurovision rules, all nations with the exceptions of the host country and the "Big Five" (France, Germany, Italy, Spain and the United Kingdom) are required to qualify from one of two semi-finals in order to compete for the final; the top ten countries from each semi-final progress to the final. The European Broadcasting Union (EBU) split up the competing countries into six different pots based on voting patterns from previous contests as determined by the contest's televoting partner Digame. The semi-final allocation draw held for the Eurovision Song Contest 2020 on 28 January 2020 was used for the 2021 contest; Cyprus was placed into the first semi-final, to be held on 18 May 2021, and was scheduled to perform in the second half of the show. Once all the competing songs for the 2021 contest had been released, the running order for the semi-finals was decided by the shows' producers rather than through another draw, so that similar songs were not placed next to each other. Cyprus was set to perform in position 8, following the entry from Ireland and preceding the entry from Norway. Louis Patsalides served as the commentator for the broadcasts of the contest within Cyprus.

Performances
Marvin Dietmann was the artistic director for the entry, responsible for the country's stage performance. Technical rehearsals for the performance took place the week prior to the contest, on 9 and 12 May 2021.

The first semi-final was held on 18 May and Cyprus was announced as one of the ten countries to have qualified for the final. It was later revealed that the entry placed sixth in the semi-final, receiving a total of 170 points. Soon after, the EBU posted the running order for the final, placing Cyprus in the first position, preceding . At the close of voting for the final, held on 22 May, "El Diablo" placed 16th in the field of 26, receiving 94 points.

Voting 

Voting during the three shows involved each country awarding two sets of points from 1-8, 10 and 12: one from their professional jury and the other from televoting. The judges assessed each entry based on the performances during the second Dress Rehearsal of each show, which took place the night before each live show, against a set of criteria including: vocal capacity; the stage performance; the song's composition and originality; and the overall impression by the act. The exact composition of the professional jury, and the results of each country's jury and televoting were released after the final; the individual results from each jury member were also released in an anonymised form.

Below is a breakdown of points awarded to Cyprus in the first semi-final, as well as by the country in the final. In the first semi-final, Cyprus placed 6th with a total of 170 points, thus qualifying for the final. The performance received 78 televoting points, which included the maximum 12 awarded by Malta. The jury points added to 92, including 12 from Slovenia. In the final, Cyprus placed 16th with 94 points, with two sets of 12 points from Greece (jury and televote) and one set from Russia's televote. Over the course of the contest, Cyprus awarded its 12 points in the first semi-final to Lithuania (televote) and Malta (jury), while in the final, both sets were awarded to Greece. Loukas Hamatsos served as Cyprus's spokesperson for the voting portion of the final, announcing the country's jury vote.

Points awarded to Cyprus

Points awarded by Cyprus

Detailed voting results 
The following members comprised the Cypriot jury:
 Andreas
 Marilena Charalambidou
 Christiana Mitella
 Alexandros Taramountas

References

 

2021
Countries in the Eurovision Song Contest 2021
Eurovision